Ned Wynn (born Edmond Keenan Wynn; April 27, 1941 – December 20, 2020) was an American actor and screenwriter.

Personal life
He was the son of actor Keenan Wynn and the grandson of Ed Wynn.

Death
He died of Parkinson's disease in Healdsburg, Sonoma County, California on December 20, 2020 at the age of 79.

Filmography

Actor
The Bellboy (1960) - Bellhop (uncredited)
The Absent-Minded Professor (1961) - Boy (uncredited)
Son of Flubber (1963) - Rutland Student Manager (uncredited)
The Patsy (1964) - Band Member
Bikini Beach (1964) - Surfer #9
Pajama Party (1964) - Pajama Boy
Beach Blanket Bingo (1965) - Beach Boy
How to Stuff a Wild Bikini (1965) - Beach Boy
Stagecoach (1966) - Ike Plummer
California Dreaming (1979) - Earl Fescue
Don't Go to Sleep (1982, TV Movie) - Paramedic (final film role)

Screenwriter
California Dreaming (1979)
Don't Go to Sleep (1982)
Velvet (1984)
Holy Joe (1999)

References

External links
 

1941 births
2020 deaths
Male actors from New York City
American male film actors
American people of Irish descent
American people of Romanian-Jewish descent
American people of Czech-Jewish descent
American people of Ottoman-Jewish descent
20th-century American male actors